Pudhu Pudhu Ragangal is a 1990 Indian Tamil-language romantic drama film directed by V. Aadhavan. It stars Sithara and Anand Babu. The film was released on 1 November 1990.

Plot 
Searching for livelihood, Kanikaa and her mother arrive in a fishing hamlet. The locals too extend their support to the women. But several, intriguing twists and turns follow in their lives.

Cast 

Sithara as Kanika
Anand Babu as Babu
Charan Raj as Sarath
Nagesh
M. N. Nambiar
V. K. Ramasamy
Delhi Ganesh
Rajesh
Uday Prakash
Charle
Manorama
Kumarimuthu
Gundu Kalyanam

Soundtrack
Soundtrack was composed by S. A. Rajkumar.

Release and reception
Pudhu Pudhu Ragangal was released on 1 November 1990. N. Krishnaswamy of The Indian Express wrote, "The story line tends to ramble and one does not understand whats going on for some time". C. R. K. of Kalki called the film a different raga.

Aadhavan later launched another film titled Anbe Diana in 1999 starring Udhai and Mehr Hassan, but the film did not release. A second film with Udhai titled Priya Vidai also failed to develop post production.

References

External links 
 

1990 drama films
1990 films
1990s Tamil-language films
Films scored by S. A. Rajkumar
Indian drama films